The William & Mary Tribe are a college football team representing the College of William & Mary in Williamsburg, Virginia. William & Mary competes in the Colonial Athletic Association of the NCAA's Division I Football Championship Subdivision. They are currently coached by Mike London. He succeeds Jimmye Laycock, who was the head coach of the Tribe for 39 years.

William & Mary's traditional rival in football is the University of Richmond. William & Mary and Richmond have met 120 times since 1898, making the rivalry (sometimes referred to as "the South's oldest rivalry") the fourth most-played in Division I college football. Only Lafayette–Lehigh, Princeton–Yale, and Harvard–Yale have played more games. The winner of this annual W&M–Richmond match-up claims the Capital Cup (previously known as the I-64 Trophy), named for the last two Virginia state capitals, Richmond and Williamsburg. In 2008, William & Mary opened the Jimmye Laycock Football Center, housing the Tribe locker room, football players' classroom study sessions and tape review rooms.

The College of William & Mary has transitioned through several official nicknames since its athletic program began in 1893. From 1893 to 1916, William & Mary football players were known as the Orange and White because those were the old official school colors. From 1916 to 1977, all William & Mary athletes were known as the Indians. Since 1978, they have been known as the Tribe.

History

The William & Mary Tribe football team had sustained success during Jimmye Laycock's tenure. Since his taking over as head coach, W&M enjoyed over 25 winning seasons and 10 playoff appearances, the 23rd most appearances of any FCS program.  The long-time head-coach led the Tribe to multiple playoff appearances, including the national semifinal game on two occasions.  Most recently, the Tribe lost in a quarterfinal matchup against University of Richmond in 2015. In 2009 the Tribe also reached the semifinal against eventual champions Villanova in 2009, losing by a single point. The team has also appeared in three bowl games: the 1948 Dixie Bowl, 1949 Delta Bowl and 1970 Tangerine Bowl. The Tribe are 1–2 in those games, with the lone win being a 20–0 victory over Oklahoma A&M in 1949.

Rivalries
Aside from William & Mary's lengthy Capital Cup rivalry with the University of Richmond, the Tribe also hold historic rivalries with in-state opponents like James Madison University and the Virginia Military Institute, as well as out-of-state opponents like the University of Delaware. As of 2022, the Richmond Spiders and Delaware Blue Hens are still football members of the Colonial Athletic Association with William & Mary. William & Mary also maintains older, less intense rivalries with the VMI Keydets from its days in the Southern Conference, and the Virginia Cavaliers as part of the unofficial Jefferson Cup, named after Thomas Jefferson, who attended the College of William & Mary before founding the University of Virginia. The Tribe holds non-conference rivalries against the Old Dominion Monarchs and the James Madison Dukes of the Sun Belt Conference, both competing in the CAA before joining the FBS in 2014 and 2022, respectively.

Series records
 Records through November 19, 2022

Currently in the NFL
Current as of the 2023 football season.

Coaches
 Joe Brady (Class of 2012) – quarterbacks coach for the Buffalo Bills
 David Corley Jr. (Class of 2003) – assistant quarterbacks coach for the Pittsburgh Steelers
 Mark Duffner (Class of 1975) – senior defensive assistant for the Cincinnati Bengals
 Sean McDermott (Class of 1998) – head coach of the Buffalo Bills
 Robert Livingston (Class of 2009) – secondary coach for the Cincinnati Bengals
 Kevin Rogers (Class of 1974) – senior offensive assistant for the Cleveland Browns
 Mike Tomlin (Class of 1995) – head coach of the Pittsburgh Steelers; youngest head coach in NFL history to lead team to Super Bowl win (36 years old; Super Bowl XLIII)
 Alan Williams (Class of 1992) – defensive coordinator for the Chicago Bears

Players
 DeAndre Houston-Carson (Class of 2016) – safety for the Chicago Bears
 Bill Murray (Class of 2020) - Defensive Tackle for the New England Patriots
 Luke Rhodes (Class of 2016) - linebacker and long snapper for the Indianapolis Colts; two-time All-Pro selection (2020, 2021)
 Andrew Trainer (Class of 2022) – offensive tackle for the Los Angeles Chargers

Currently in the CFL

Coaches
 Billy Parker (Class of 2004) – analyst for the Vegas Vipers

Players
 Adrian Tracy (Class of 2010) – defensive end for the Toronto Argonauts
 Devonte Dedmon (Class of 2019) – wide receiver and kick returner for the Ottawa Redblacks; John Agro Special Teams Award recipient (2021)

Championships

Conference championships
The Tribe have won 13 conference championships, with five won outright.

† Co-championship

Division championships
The Tribe have one division title, won during their time in the Yankee Conference.

Bowl games
William & Mary have participated in three bowl games. The Tribe have a record of 1–2.

Playoffs
The Tribe have participated in the playoffs 11 times, with 18 total playoff games played for a record of 8–11.

Halls of Fame inductees

College Football
 Jack Cloud – Set a school scoring record of 102 points in 1947 and once scored five touchdowns in a single game
 Bill Fincher – Did not attend W&M, but coached the Indians in 1921
 Lou Holtz – Did not attend W&M, but coached the Indians from 1969–1971 and led the team to the 1970 Tangerine Bowl
 Bill Ingram – Did not attend W&M, but Ingram began his coaching career at William & Mary, where in 1922 he managed a 6–3 record
 Buster Ramsey – In his four years (1939–1942) the school had a record of 29–7–3; the 1942 team were Southern Conference champions

National Football League (NFL)
 Lou Creekmur – After playing for the Indians he went on to become of one of the most successful offensive tackles in Detroit Lions history
 Marv Levy – Did not attend W&M, but coached William & Mary for five years (1964–1968), earning two Southern Conference Coach of the Year awards and one SoCon title (1966); the 27–16 win over Navy in 1967 is considered by the NCAA to be one of the top 10 greatest upsets in college football history

Canadian Football League (CFL)
 Mike "Pinball" Clemons – compiled 4,778 all-purpose yards and was named a Division I-AA All-American
 Ralph Sazio – was a mainstay of the Canadian Football League's Hamilton Tiger-Cats as a player, assistant coach, head coach, general manager and team president

Future non-conference opponents 
Announced schedules as of December 9, 2022.

References
Notes

Sources

External links

 

 
American football teams established in 1893
William and Mary Indians football